Dockrell is a surname. Notable people with the surname include:

Hazel Dockrell (born 1952), Irish-born microbiologist and immunologist
Henry Morgan Dockrell (1880–1955), Irish Cumann na nGaedhael and Fine Gael party politician
Marguerite Dockrell (1912–1983), Irish swimmer
Maurice Dockrell (Unionist politician) (1850–1929), Irish businessman and politician from Dublin
Maurice E. Dockrell (1908–1986), Irish Fine Gael party politician
Percy Dockrell (1914–1979), Irish Fine Gael party politician